An Indy grab, also known as an Indy air, is an aerial skateboarding, snowboarding and kitesurfing trick during which the rider grabs their back hand on the middle of their board, between their feet, on the side of the board where their toes are pointing, while turning backside. This trick is done only backside; the same maneuver done while turning front side, is called a front side air. The Indy grab is a generic skateboarding trick that has been performed since the late 1970s. This trick is performed mainly while vert skating, e.g. on halfpipes. Although this move can be done on flat land, it is much easier on a ramp. The Indy grab is one of the basic tricks in vert skating and is usually combined with spins, kickflips and heelflips.

The Indy air was originally called the Gunnair, which was invented by Gunnar Haugo in 1977. By 1980, the trick was renamed the Indy air, which was popularized by Duane Peters. The trick involves doing a backside air while gripping one's board on the toe side, between the feet with the trailing hand. If the board is grabbed during a frontside air, the trick is simply called a "frontside air", as opposed to a frontside ollie, in which there is no grab. Many variations have come into existence as skaters push the limits of creativity and physical exertion. Two of the most popular variations are the kickflip Indy and Indy nosebone.

The term Indy grab may also be misapplied to any aerial in which the rider grabs the toe side of their board with their trailing hand (as in snowboarding). This confusion is partly due to the name's being applied to all such grabs in the Tony Hawk's Pro Skater video game.

References

Skateboarding tricks
Snowboarding tricks